All Saints is the second largest town in Antigua and Barbuda,  with a population of 3,412. Just 5 miles NW of here is the capital, St. John's. It had a population of 3,900 in 2001.

Within the vicinity of the town is Betty's Hope, the first large-scale sugarcane plantation in Antigua. Betty's Hope was built in 1674 by Sir Christopher Codrington, the namesake of Codrington, and was named for his daughter, Elizabeth Codrington. The only remaining structures are two stone sugar mills and the remains of the stillhouse, though its important role in Antigua's history has inspired its government to turn it into an open-air museum.

The area around All Saints is known for its traditional pottery. Potter's Village, a nearby settlement, is named after it.

Demographics 
All Saints has eleven enumeration districts.

Saint John Parish 

 33901  AllSaints-N_1 
 33902  AllSaints-N_2 
 34000  AllSaints-PoliceStation

Saint Peter Parish 

 50100  AllSaints-Jonas
 50201  AllSaints-North 
 50202  AllSaints-North 
 50301  AllSaintsPlayG1 
 50302  AllSaintsPlayG2 
 50400  AllSaintsAnglicanChurch

Saint Paul Parish 

 70100 AllSaints-East 
 70200 AllSaints-South

Census Data 
Source:

References

Populated places in Antigua and Barbuda
Saint Peter Parish, Antigua and Barbuda